Jerzy Stanisław Besala (born 5 September 1951 in Warsaw) is a Polish historian and publicist. Author of over a dozen books and numerous articles. Some of his articles are published for general readers in popular Polish magazines and newspapers.

Bibliography 

 Stanisław Żółkiewski, Warszawa 1988, .
 Stefan Batory, Warszawa 1992, .
 Tajemnice historii Polski, Poznań 2003.
 Małżeństwa królewskie. Piastowie, Warszawa 2006.
 Małżeństwa królewskie. Jagiellonowie, Warszawa 2006.
 Małżeństwa królewskie. Władcy elekcyjni, Warszawa 2007.
 Tajemnicze dzieje Europy, Warszawa 2007.
 Barbara Radziwiłłówna i Zygmunt August, Warszawa 2007, .
 Alkoholowe dzieje Polski. Czasy Piastów i Rzeczypospolitej szlacheckiej, Poznań 2015
 Rewizja nadzwyczajna. Skazy na królach i inne historie, Bellona 2018

References
 Biographical note at Wirtualna Polska portal

External links
 Besala in WorldCat
  Roman Sidorski, Interview with Besala, Histmag, 2008-12-06

1951 births
20th-century Polish historians
Polish male non-fiction writers
Living people
Historians of Poland
21st-century Polish historians